Scott Hennig (born April 17, 1969) is an American former athlete who specialized in the pole vault.

Hennig, a Canyon High School graduate, attended Southwest Texas State University and was a four-time SLC indoor champion. He won the pole vault at the U.S. national indoor championships in 1998 and the following year finished second to Pat Manson at the Pan American Games in Winnipeg, to claim a silver medal for the United States.

References

External links

1969 births
Living people
American male pole vaulters
Track and field athletes from Texas
Texas State Bobcats men's track and field athletes
Pan American Games silver medalists for the United States
Medalists at the 1999 Pan American Games
Athletes (track and field) at the 1999 Pan American Games
Pan American Games medalists in athletics (track and field)
20th-century American people
21st-century American people